Torben Ulsø Olsen (born 27 June 1960) is a Danish equestrian. He competed in two events at the 1984 Summer Olympics.

References

External links
 

1960 births
Living people
Danish male equestrians
Danish dressage riders
Olympic equestrians of Denmark
Equestrians at the 1984 Summer Olympics
People from Næstved Municipality
Sportspeople from Region Zealand